is a Japanese manga artist. He is best known for writing cooking manga series such as Mister Ajikko and Shōta no Sushi, which earned him twice the Kodansha Manga Award for shōnen in 1988 and 1996 respectively. Both series have been adapted as dramas, the latter as a live-action television series, the former as the first cooking anime television series.

Works 
 , 1986–1989, 10 volumes
 , 1990–1991, 4 volumes
 , 1992–1997, 27 volumes
 , 1997–2000, 17 volumes
 , 2001, 4 volumes
 , 2002–2009, 16 volumes
 , 2003–2012, 13 volumes

References

External links 
 
 Profile at The Ultimate Manga Guide

1959 births
Living people
Manga artists from Hyōgo Prefecture
Winner of Kodansha Manga Award (Shōnen)
People from Kobe